Ruble Church is a historic church at the junction of CR 34/1 and 34/2 in Burning Springs, Wirt County, West Virginia. Also on the property is the church cemetery, in which the oldest graves are dated to 1857–1858.

It was listed on the National Register of Historic Places in 1982.

The church was demolished in September 2020. As of November 2020, it is being reconstructed on the same spot using some of the original logs.

References

Churches on the National Register of Historic Places in West Virginia
Churches in West Virginia
Churches completed in 1854
19th-century churches in the United States
Buildings and structures in Wirt County, West Virginia
National Register of Historic Places in Wirt County, West Virginia
Wooden churches in West Virginia
1854 establishments in Virginia
Log buildings and structures on the National Register of Historic Places in West Virginia
Demolished buildings and structures in West Virginia
Buildings and structures demolished in 2020